Anna Catharina Tintin Anderzon (born 29 April 1964) is a Swedish actress and daughter of actress Kim Anderzon.

Biography
Anderzon co-starred in the feature film Marianne (2011) and has also starred in many Swedish film and television roles.

Filmography
2011 – Marianne
2010 – Sector 236 - Thor's Wrath
2004 – Håkan Bråkan & Josef
2003 – Håkan Bråkan
2000 – Före stormen
1999 – En häxa i familjen
1999 – Stjärnsystrar
1997 – Tic Tac
1997 – Adam & Eva
1995 – En på miljonen

References

External links 

Swedish film actresses
1964 births
Living people
Swedish television actresses
Best Supporting Actress Guldbagge Award winners